Mila Handhuvaru is a 1998 Maldivian drama film edited and directed by Hamid Ali. Produced by Hussain Rasheed under Farivaa Films, the film stars Mariyam Nisha and Mohamed Hussain in pivotal roles.

Premise
Adamfulhu (Amjad Ibrahim) disowned his only child, Sameem, when he married an under-privileged woman whom he despised. They give birth to a daughter before the couple was killed in a boat crash, leaving their daughter, Mariyam (Mariyam Nisha), and her aunt as two of the few survivors. Realizing his mistake, Adamfulhu hailed Mariyam as his own child. Long back, Adamfulhu and Sithi Fulhu (Sithi Fulhu) arranged a deal to marry their children, Mariyam and Ihusan (Mohamed Hassan) who have not met each other. In order to evade from the marriage, Mariyam fakes a relationship and lied to Adamfulhu saying that she has secretly married someone else. Ihusan becomes an aspiring actor while Mariyam hires him to act like her husband.

Cast 
 Mariyam Nisha as Mariyam
 Mohamed Hassan as Ihusan / Ishaq
 Hamid Ali as Hamid
 Nathasha as Niuma
 Amjad Ibrahim as Adamfulhu
 Aminath Ishnan Inan
 Sithi Fulhu as Sithi Fulhu

Soundtrack

References

1998 films
Maldivian drama films
1998 drama films
Dhivehi-language films